Torymus pachypsyllae is a species of Torymid wasp found in North America. It primarily attacks the psyllid Pachypsylla celtidismamma, although it is known to attack other related species in the genus Pachypsylla.

References

Chalcidoidea
Insects described in 1888